Ida Gjølga Jenshus (born April 25, 1987) is a country artist from Steinkjer in Norway.

After winning a talent competition in 2007, she recorded her first studio album in spring 2008 at the studio of record producers Lars Lien and Håkon Gebhardt. 
 
The singles These are the days and For the Nation, were released prior to the release of the album entitled Color of the Sun, that was released on October 13, 2008. She won the Norwegian Spellemann Award 2008 for best country album. In 2010, she released her second album, No Guarantees, that won the Spellemann Award 2010 in the country category. She released her third studio album in October 2012 in Norway.

Ida Jenshus Band
 Ida Jenshus – vocals and guitars
 Alexander Pettersen – guitar, mandolin, harmonica and vocals
 Håkon Gebhardt – banjo and guitar
 Stian Lundberg – drums
 Kjell "KK" Karlsen – pedal steel
 Aleksander Gifstad – bass

Discography

Albums

Singles
These Are the Days (2008)
For The Nation (2008)
Better Day (2010)
I Waited (2010)
Someone to Love (2012)
Marie (What Happened to the Music?) (2012)
 Days of Nothing (2013)
 Ego in a Bag (2014), with Sugarfoot
 Shallow River (2014)
Hero (2014)
My Last Goodbye (2015)
 Changes (2015)
 In Your Arms (2017)
 Love You A Little Less (2018)
 Over Before It Strandet (2019)
 That Morning (2019)
 Fin dag (2021) with Rasmus Rohde
 Heim igjen (2020)

TV Filmography
Lyden av Lørdag (2007)
Sommerspillet (2010)
Sommeråpent (2012)

Equipment

Gretsch White Falcon and Harmony Sovereign

Sources

External links 

 Official home page

1987 births
Living people
Norwegian country singers
Norwegian guitarists
Musicians from Steinkjer
21st-century Norwegian singers
21st-century Norwegian women singers
21st-century Norwegian guitarists
21st-century women guitarists